Bentley railway station was a railway station built by the Wolverhampton and Walsall Railway in 1872, and was operated by the Midland Railway from 1876 onwards. Situated on Bloxwich Lane, it served the area of Bentley, located between Willenhall and Walsall in the English West Midlands (then in Staffordshire). The station closed in 1898.

Station site today

The station site was obliterated in the 1960s due to the construction of the M6 near Walsall and Willenhall which was built directly through the site of the former Bentley station and caused closure of the Walsall-Wednesfield section of the Wolverhampton and Walsall Railway.

The site is now under the M6 Motorway near Junction 10 with the north side now a public footpath and the south side towards North Walsall now overgrown. The only evidence of the former railway are two removed bridge supports on Bloxwich Lane .

References

Disused railway stations in Walsall
Railway stations in Great Britain opened in 1872
Railway stations in Great Britain closed in 1898
Former Midland Railway stations